John Arlen Patera (August 1, 1933  – October 31, 2018) was an American football player and coach in the National Football League.  for the   and  and was an assistant coach for the   and  Patera was the first head coach of the  with a career head coaching record of  all with the Seahawks.

Early years
Born in Bismarck, North Dakota, Patera attended Washington High School in  Upon graduation in 1951, he enrolled at the University of Oregon in Eugene, where he played college football for the Ducks from 1951  earning All-Pacific Coast Conference honors as a guard in his senior year.

In 1982, Patera was inducted into the Oregon Sports Hall of Fame. In 2000, he was inducted into the University of Oregon Athletics Hall of Fame.

Professional career

Baltimore Colts
Patera was selected by the Baltimore Colts in the fourth round (44th overall) of the 1955 NFL Draft. Although he was the left guard as a rookie, because of an injury to the starting middle linebacker, he was forced to play both offense and defense for three weeks, before concentrating fully on being the team's middle linebacker.

Patera played linebacker for three seasons under head coach Weeb Ewbank. After choosing not to switch back to offense, he was released on September 15, 1958.

Chicago Cardinals
On September 17, 1958, Patera was signed by the Chicago Cardinals and played for two seasons under head coach Frank Ivy.

Dallas Cowboys
In 1960, Patera was selected by the Dallas Cowboys in the expansion draft. Under head coach Tom Landry, he was designated as the first starting middle linebacker in franchise history. His playing career ended early when he re-injured his knee in the fourth game of the season against the Cleveland Browns. He was replaced with Jerry Tubbs.

Patera returned in 1961, but played in only two games and retired at the end of the season after not being fully recovered from his previous injury.

Coaching career

Assistant coach
His playing days over, Patera turned his attention to coaching and joined the Los Angeles Rams in 1963 as a defensive line coach. During his tenure with the Rams from 1963 to 1967, he was responsible for directing the Fearsome Foursome, one of the most dominating defensive lines in the NFL during the sixties.

In 1968, Patera became an assistant coach for the New York Giants, but left after one year to take an assistant coaching position with the Minnesota Vikings under head coach Bud Grant. As defensive line coach with the Vikings from 1969 through 1975, Patera worked with another very talented and dominant defensive line, nicknamed the Purple People Eaters. During this period, the Vikings went to three Super Bowls (IV, VIII, IX).

Head coach
In January , Patera was hired as the head coach for the expansion  Shortly after arriving, he began the difficult task of building a competitive team from the ground up. Along with the Tampa Bay Buccaneers, the Seahawks selected 39 players through the expansion draft on    26 teams each protected 29 players on their rosters; Seattle and Tampa Bay alternated selections from the remaining pool of unprotected players. Acquiring quality veteran players via free agency was not an aspect of the league at that time. However, the Seahawks were awarded the second overall pick in the 1976 NFL Draft, a pick they used on defensive tackle Steve Niehaus, an All-America defensive tackle at Notre Dame, who went on to be a bust in the NFL, unlike fellow Fighting Irish defensive linemen Ross Browner and Mike Fanning, each of whom went on to start in a Super Bowl and enjoyed lengthy professional careers.

Since he would not have the player talent to compete with other NFL teams possessing superior power, speed and finesse, Patera resorted to a wide-open gambling style offense that was centered around a passing game using many creative gadget plays. "I had a team that could move the ball like hell, but couldn't stop anybody." Patera said, "So I figured that to win more ballgames we'd simply have to gamble more often.  I would much rather have beaten teams on muscle and execution, but we just didn't have the talent."

Seahawks improved  in their third season, Patera was voted the NFL Coach of the Year in 1978 by the Associated Press and The Sporting News.

As a head coach, Patera was considered to be a stern disciplinarian with strict rules of conduct. For example, he required players to hold their helmets a certain way on the sidelines during the playing of the national anthem. His players were required to wear coats and ties when traveling on the road. One of his most controversial rules was that he wouldn't allow players to have water breaks during practices at training camp in Cheney in eastern Washington, where temperatures frequently reached above  in July and August, a common practice by many teams back then.

Patera's relationship with the local press in Seattle was stormy at times. He did not enjoy the constant questions about his coaching decisions and the dissection of his team's performance by the sports reporters. He once held a seven-second press conference after a particularly difficult loss in Seattle. After asking, "Any questions?", he left the room when reporters started giggling when none of them spoke up.

In , the players' association (NFLPA) was threatening to strike over deadlocked negotiations with NFL team owners to give a percentage of the gross revenues for player salaries. Patera's relationship with his players rapidly deteriorated when he first threatened and then fined players for participating in a union solidarity handshake with the opposing team at midfield during pre-season games (actually it was team management that made the decision; GM John Thompson was a former head of the NFL bargaining committee). When Sam McCullum, a popular player and union representative, was cut by Patera one week before the season started, it was speculated the release was done as retaliation for McCullum's union  The release was eventually ruled an illegal termination in an "Unfair Labor Practice" lawsuit brought against the team by the NFLPA and McCullum.

After losing the first two games of the 1982 season, Patera was fired by the Seahawks on October 13, along with general manager  The announcement was made by  representing the Nordstrom family as majority owners. The firing occurred during the 57-day NFL players strike which had started on September 21. He was replaced by  the Seahawks director of football operations, as the interim head coach for the remainder of the

Head coaching record

Personal life
After leaving the Seahawks, Patera never took another coaching position and completely retired from football. He resided east of Seattle in Cle Elum with his three dogs. He and his wife, Susan, were divorced after 44 years of marriage. They had four children, 9 grandchildren, and 11 great grandchildren.

Patera was the older brother of Olympic weightlifter and professional wrestler Ken Patera and San Francisco 49ers player Dennis Patera.

On a morning deer hunt east of Eugene in 1954, Patera accidentally shot and killed former Oregon teammate Ken Sweitzer, a graduate assistant with the team. It was ruled accidental and he was cleared of negligence.

Patera died at the age of 85 from pancreatic cancer on October 31, 2018.

References

External links

1933 births
2018 deaths
People from Cle Elum, Washington
Sportspeople from Bismarck, North Dakota
Sportspeople from Portland, Oregon
Players of American football from North Dakota
Players of American football from Portland, Oregon
American football guards
American football linebackers
Washington High School (Portland, Oregon) alumni
Oregon Ducks football players
Baltimore Colts players
Chicago Cardinals players
Dallas Cowboys players
Coaches of American football from North Dakota
Coaches of American football from Oregon
Los Angeles Rams coaches
New York Giants coaches
Minnesota Vikings coaches
Seattle Seahawks head coaches
Deaths from pancreatic cancer